Streptomyces aquilus is a bacterium species from the genus Streptomyces which has been isolated from the leaves of the plant Xanthium sibiricum from the Hunan University of Science and Technology in China.

See also 
 List of Streptomyces species

References 

aquilus
Bacteria described in 2020